The  is an electric multiple unit (EMU) train type introduced in March 1987 by Japanese National Railways (JNR), and currently operated by Shikoku Railway Company (JR Shikoku) on local services in Shikoku, Japan.

Design
The 121 series design is based on the earlier 105 series, with lightweight stainless steel bodies.

The motor bogies were the same DT33A bogies as used on the JNR-era 103 series EMUs, and the trailer cars used DT21T bogies recovered from withdrawn 101 series EMUs. The pantographs were also recovered from withdrawn 101 series EMUs.

Operations
The sets are based at Takamatsu Depot and operate on the Yosan Line and Dosan Line in 2-, 4-, or 6-car formations.

Formations
, the fleet consists of 18 two-car 121 series sets and one 7200 series formed of one motored "Mc" car and one non-powered "Tc" trailer car as shown below with the motored "Mc" cars at the Takamatsu end.

121 series

The "Mc" cars are each fitted with one S-PS58 lozenge-type pantograph.

7200 series

The "Mc" cars are each fitted with one S-PS58 lozenge-type pantograph.

Interiors
Seating is arranged as a mix of transverse seating bays and longitudinal bench seats. The sets are not equipped with toilets.

History
The 121 series sets were introduced on 23 March 1987, just nine days before JNR was privatized on 1 April, following which the 121 series fleet came under control of JR Shikoku. The sets were originally delivered with magenta "Red No. 20" bodyside stripes, but were repainted with JR Shikoku corporate light blue ("Blue No. 26") bodyside stripes during September and October 1987.

In 1992, the original pantographs were replaced with the same S-PS58 type pantographs also used on the JR Shikoku 7000 series EMUs to ensure adequate clearance through tunnels on newly electrified sections of the Yosan Line.

In 2011, two sets (numbers 001 and 002) were modified for wanman driver only operation. These sets were repainted with their original JNR-style magenta bodyside stripes.

Refurbishment and conversion

From 2016, the entire fleet of 19 two-car trainsets is scheduled to undergo refurbishment, and at the same time reclassified "7200 series". Refurbishment includes replacement of the DC motors with 140 kW AC motors and VVVF control, new side windows, new "efWing" CFRP bogies (S-DT67ef motor bogies and S-TR67ef trailer bogies), and a new livery based on the original style with a thin green line added to the magenta bodyside stripe. Internally, the refurbished trains have fixed four-person seating bays on one side with longitudinal bench seating on the other.

The first trainset to be treated, set 3, was outshopped from JR Shikoku's Tadotsu Works in February 2016, and entered service from 13 June 2016.

Fleet history
The individual build histories for the fleet are as follows.

References

Electric multiple units of Japan
121 series
Train-related introductions in 1987
Hitachi multiple units
Kawasaki multiple units
Kinki Sharyo multiple units
Tokyu Car multiple units
1500 V DC multiple units of Japan